The Journal of Medical Biochemistry is a quarterly peer-reviewed open access medical journal covering research in medical biochemistry, clinical chemistry, and related disciplines. It was established in 1982 as Jugoslovenska medicinska biohemija, obtaining its current name in 2007. It is published by Walter de Gruyter on behalf of the Society of Medical Biochemists of Serbia.

The journal exhibited unusual levels of self-citation and its journal impact factor of 2019 was suspended from the Journal Citation Reports in 2020, a sanction which hit 34 journals in total.

Editors-in-chief
The following persons are or have been editors-in-chief of the journal:
Neda Longino (1982–1988)
Ernest Suchanek (1988–1992)
Nada Majkić-Singh (1992–present)

Abstracting and indexing
The journal is abstracted and indexed in:

References

External links

Biochemistry journals
De Gruyter academic journals
English-language journals
Open access journals
Quarterly journals
Publications established in 1982